Blood Contact is the fourth novel of the military science fiction StarFist Saga by American writers David Sherman and Dan Cragg. This book in the series follows Gunnery Sergeant Bass and the rest of 3rd Platoon, Company L, 34th FIST as they investigate a missing scientific team on the planet Society 437.  Initially expecting that pirates are to blame for the failure of the team to check in as scheduled, 3rd Platoon discovers something far more deadly and dangerous is behind the destruction of the station.  What they find has serious implications for the entire human race.  The Skinks, a race of bipedal, amphibian-like creatures who wield acid guns, conduct a campaign to wipe out the entire Scientific Society.

1999 science fiction novels
StarFist series
1999 American novels
Del Rey books